Sultan Saif (10 June 1993 – 15 October 2020) was an Emirati footballer. He played as a striker.

He died on 15 October 2020, due to a traffic collision in Abu Dhabi.

External links

References

Emirati footballers
1993 births
2020 deaths
Al Wahda FC players
Baniyas Club players
Al-Ittihad Kalba SC players
Place of birth missing
Al Falah FC players
UAE First Division League players
UAE Pro League players
UAE Second Division League players
Association football forwards
Road incident deaths in the United Arab Emirates